Blast Vegas (also known as Destruction: Las Vegas) is a 2013 made-for-television supernatural disaster film about an Egyptian sandstorm curse that destroys Las Vegas, Nevada. It first aired on the Syfy channel on July 18, 2013, and stars Frankie Muniz, Barry Bostwick,  and Maggie Castle.

Premise
Frat brothers head to Las Vegas for spring break. When one of them steals an ancient Egyptian sword on display in a casino, they unwittingly release a curse that invokes a disastrous sandstorm in Las Vegas. This city is slowly being destroyed while Nelson (Frankie Muniz) and his girlfriend Olive (Maggie Castle), along with Sal (Barry Bostwick) race to remove the curse and calm the storm.

Cast 
 Frankie Muniz as Nelson, the protagonist who is trying to remove the curse.
 Barry Bostwick as Sal, a Las Vegas lounge singer who helps Nelson and Olive.
 Maggie Castle as Olive, Nelson's new found girlfriend who's educated in the history of the curse.

Production
The film was written by Tom Teves and Joe D'Ambrosia and directed by Jack Perez. The initial idea of the film originated in Summer 2007, when The Asylum announced that the film will be released by February 14, 2012 as Destruction: Las Vegas. Suddenly in Summer 2010, it didn't work due to Grimm's Snow White being produced for that time. By Fall 2010, the producers announced for a tentative Spring 2013 airdate on TNT. Filming began around Spring 2012. Base FX and R-Team provided visual effects and CGI Animation for the film. On Fall 2012, Syfy acquired the rights to air the film by July 18, 2013.

References

External links 
 
 

2013 television films
2010s disaster films
2013 fantasy films
2013 action films
American disaster films
American fantasy films
American television films
Action television films
Ancient Egypt in fiction
Fiction about curses
Films directed by Jack Perez
Films set in the Las Vegas Valley
Syfy original films
2013 films
2010s English-language films
2010s American films